Less Than Human may refer to:
Less Than Human (album), a 2005 album by The Juan MacLean
Less Than Human (novel), a 2004 science fiction novel by Maxine McArthur
"Less than Human", a single on The Chameleons' 1983 album Script of the Bridge